Sutter's Fort was a 19th-century agricultural and trade colony in the Mexican Alta California province. The site of the fort was established in 1839 and originally called New Helvetia (New Switzerland) by its builder John Sutter, though construction of the fort proper would not begin until 1841. The fort was the first non-indigenous community in the California Central Valley. The fort is famous for its association with the Donner Party, the California Gold Rush, and the formation of the city of Sacramento, surrounding the fort. It is notable for its proximity to the end of the California Trail and Siskiyou Trails, which it served as a waystation.

After gold was discovered at Sutter's Mill (also owned by John Sutter) in Coloma on January 24, 1848, the fort was abandoned. The adobe structure has been restored to its original condition and is now administered by California Department of Parks and Recreation. It was designated a National Historic Landmark in 1961.

Description 

The Main Building of the fort is a two-story adobe structure built between 1841 and 1843. This building is the only original surviving structure at the reconstructed Sutter's Fort State Historic Park. It was in here on January 28, 1848, that James Marshall met privately with Sutter in order to show Sutter the gold that Marshall had found during the construction of Sutter's sawmill along the American River only four days earlier. Pioneers took residence at Sutter's Fort around 1841. Following word of the Gold Rush, the fort was largely deserted by the 1850s and fell into disrepair.

In 1891, the Native Sons of the Golden West, who sought to safeguard many of the landmarks of California's pioneer days, purchased and rehabilitated Sutter's Fort when the City of Sacramento sought to demolish it. Repair efforts were completed in 1893 and the fort was given by the Native Sons of the Golden West to the State of California. In 1947, the fort was transferred to the authority of California State Parks.

Most of the original neighborhood structures were initially built in the late 1930s as residences, many of which have been converted to commercial uses such as private medical practices. The history of the neighborhood is largely residential.

Construction 
The party led by John Sutter landed on the bank of the American River in August 1839. The group included three Europeans and a Native American boy, probably to serve as interpreter. Most of the colony's first members were Native Hawaiians. Sutter had entered a contract with the governor of Hawaii to hire eight men and two women for three years. Once the first camp was setup, Sutter arranged for local Miwok and Nisenan people to build the first building, a three-room adobe.

Geography and hydrology 
The slope elevation decreases northward toward the American River and westward toward the Sacramento River. Slope elevation gradually increases to the south and east, away from the rivers. All surface drainage flows toward the Sacramento River. Groundwater in the vicinity flows south-southwest toward the Sacramento Delta. However, after peak rainfall, the Sacramento River swells and the groundwater flow can actually reverse away from the river.

See also 
 California State Indian Museum
 Old Sacramento State Historic Park
 History of Sacramento, California
 List of California State Historic Parks
 California Historical Landmarks in Sacramento County, California
 National Register of Historic Places listings in Sacramento County, California

Further reading 

 Gwinn, Herbert D.. (1931). The history of Sutter's Fort, 1839–1931. University of the Pacific, Thesis. https://scholarlycommons.pacific.edu/uop_etds/911

References

External links 

 John Bidwell (Sutter's Fort Pioneer Collection), 1841–1902. Collection guide, California State Library, California History Room.
 Sutter's Fort State Historic Park official site
 Virtual Sutter's Fort Virtual Web Site 
 A History of American Indians in California: Sutter's Fort
 Library of Congress, Americas Memory

Buildings and structures completed in 1839
California Gold Rush
Fort
California State Historic Parks
Museums in Sacramento, California
History museums in California
Forts in California
Military and war museums in California
Parks in Sacramento County, California
History of Sacramento, California
Adobe buildings and structures in California
Buildings and structures in Sacramento, California
California Historical Landmarks
National Historic Landmarks in California
Houses on the National Register of Historic Places in California
National Register of Historic Places in Sacramento, California
1839 establishments in Alta California
Donner Party
Landmarks in Sacramento, California
Houses in Sacramento County, California